Paul Crotto (born 1922, New York - died 2016, Paris) was a French-American painter, sculptor and printmaker.

Paul Crotto studied at the Art Student League in New York and then traveled to Europe in the early 1950s. He studied for two years at the  Accademia di Belle Arti di Firenze and then went to Paris, where he rented a studio in  Montmartre and spent another two years at Fernand Léger's Academy. He made engravings in Atelier Lacourière in Montmartre, a studio created by Roger Lacourière, where he met Henri Matisse, Joan Miró and he showed his artwork in group exhibitions with Pablo Picasso, Marc Chagall, André Derain and Jean Fautrier. In the early years after arriving in Paris, he was an art teacher at the American School. Between 1955 and 1959, Crotto visited Deià, Mallorca for the first time, on the recommendation of his friend William Waldren, who described it as 'a paradise on Earth for artists, writers and poets'.  He became part of the artistic Deià community, where he became friends with poet Robert Graves and returned there constantly throughout his life.

Crotto was discovered by the French gallerist Jeanne Castel who invited the artists to exhibit his work in 1961. Throughout his life, Crotto had been regularly exhibiting his work in solo and group exhibitions in Europe and United States. In 1963 in France, he was awarded the "Prix International de Villeneuve-sur-Lot".

He presented his work at the Salon d'Automne, Salon du Dessin et de la Peinture à l'Eau, Salon de la Jeune Peinture and Comparaisons at the Museum of Modern Art in Paris. His paintings and silkscreens are part of established art collections worldwide, such as Claude Raphaël-Leygues and Lawrence Malkin art collections.

Solo exhibitions

Galerie Jeanne Castel, Paris, 1961;

Galerie Jeanne Castel, Paris, 1962;

Galerie Blanche, Stockholm, 1963;

City of Villeneuve-sur-Lot, 1963;

Galerie René Drouet, Paris, 1964;

Musée d'Art International, San Francisco, 1965;

Galerie Grave, Munich, 1966;

Galerie Grave, Munich, 1967;

Galerie René Drouet, Paris, 1968;

Sindin Harris Galleries, New York, 1969

Maison Nationale des Artistes, Paris, 2016

Group Exhibitions:

Mostra di Artisti Americani, Florence, 1951;

American Painters in France, Galerie Craven, Paris, 1953;

Dix Ans de Prix de Villeneuve-sur-Lot, Paris, 1964;

Obelisk Gallery, Boston, 1964;

Galerie Bernheim Jeune, Paris, 1965;

Sculptures des Peintres, Galerie Le Grall, Paris, 1967 (Group exhibition with François Arnal, André Beaudin, André Derain, Jean Fautrier and Manuel Ruiz Pipo, among others)

Galerie am Alten Hof, Munchen, 1967;

School of Paris, Galerie Juarez, Los Angeles, 1967;

Artists of Europe and Israel, Riverdale, New York, 1968 (Group exhibition with Marc Chagall and Pablo Picasso among others).

References 

American artists
1922 births
2016 deaths
American expatriates in France
American expatriates in Italy